Margaret Brown (1867–1932) was an American socialite and Titanic survivor.

Margaret Brown may also refer to:

Margaret Brown (criminal) (1828–?), New York criminal and thief
Margaret Wise Brown (1910–1952), American author
Margaret Brown (film director), American film director
Margaret Brown (ichthyologist) (1918–2009), Indian-born British ichthyologist
Margaret Brown (mathematics educator), British academic
Margaret Lumley Brown (1886–1975), English occult figure of the 20th century
Margaret Miller Brown (1903–1970), Canadian classical pianist and music educator
Margaret Oliver Brown (1912–1990), Scottish painter and illustrator
Maggie Brown (born 1948), American playwright, director and actress
Margaret Sibella Brown (1866–1961), Canadian bryologist
Margaret H. Brown (1887–1978), Canadian nurse and author

See also
Kathleen Margaret Brown (born 1940), first woman in the Church of Ireland ordained to full-time ministry

Margaret Browne (disambiguation)